The Narrows is a coastal locality in the Gladstone Region, Queensland, Australia.

Geography
The waters and inlets of the Coral Sea form the north-western, northern, and north-eastern boundaries. The locality shares its name with The Narrows channel on the north-east of the locality that separates the Queensland mainland from Curtis Island.  

The northern part of the locality is wetlands and includes Balaclava Island.

Ramsay Crossing is a ford between the locality and Curtis Island.

The northern part of the locality is marshland. The southerm part of the locality is a protected area consisting of:

 Rundle Range National Park, 
 Rundle State Forest,  of production forestry
 Rundle Range Resources Reserve,

History 
Balaclava Island was named in 1864 by Commander J. Jeffrey of the Royal Navy, the captain of the HM Colonial Schooner Pearl, 1864, after the 1854 Battle of Balaclava in the Crimean War, which included the Charge of the Light Brigade.

Rundle Range National Park was gazetted on 16 December 1994 to protect an area of Casuarina cristata and dry rainforest.

Rundle Range Resources Reserve was gazetted on 11 August 2006. It was established to provide a buffer between the national park and the Rundle Shale Oil Project.

Education 
There are no schools in The Narrows. The nearest government primary schools are Ambrose State School in Ambrose to the south and Mount Larcom State School in Mount Larcom to south. The nearest government secondary schools are Mount Larcom State School (to Year 10) and Gladstone State High School (to Year 12) in West Gladstone to the south-east.

Amenities 
There are two boat ramps in the locality, managed by the Gladstone Regional Council.

References 

Gladstone Region
Coastline of Queensland
Localities in Queensland